Orthaga mangiferae is a species of snout moth in the genus Orthaga. It is found in India.

References

Moths described in 1932
Epipaschiinae
Endemic fauna of India